Randy Armstrong is an American politician. He is a Republican representing District 28A in the Idaho House of Representatives.

Early life 

Armstrong was born in Bannock County, Idaho. He holds a Bachelor of Science degree in Business from Idaho State University.

Political career 

In 2016, Ken Andrus decided not to run for re-election to seat 28A in the Idaho House of Representatives, and Armstrong ran for his seat. He won a four-way Republican primary, and went on to win the general election against Democrat Steve Landon. He won re-election in 2018, and is running again in 2020.

Armstrong currently sits on the following committees:
 Agricultural Affairs
 Business
 State Affairs

Electoral record

References 

Living people
Republican Party members of the Idaho House of Representatives
Year of birth missing (living people)
21st-century American politicians